Borås Djurpark is a  zoo in the northern part of central Borås, Sweden. It has about 500 animals of 80 different species. The zoo was founded in 1962 by Sigvard Berggren, who was manager until 1969.

Borås Djurpark is a member of the European Association of Zoos and Aquaria (EAZA). It is the only zoo in Sweden that has African bush elephant.

List of animals

There are some farm animals as well, such as cows, horses, sheep, goats, ducks, and pigs.

Conservation

As a member of the European Association of Zoos and Aquariums, the zoo participates in nine of about 130 breeding programs sponsored by the European Endangered Species Programme (EEP).

Notes

References
 Sigvard Berggren: Freedom Forest (1962, 2009)
 Sigvard Berggren: Berggren´s beasts (1969)

External links 

Opening hours, prices

Zoos in Sweden
Buildings and structures in Borås
Tourist attractions in Västra Götaland County
1962 establishments in Sweden
Zoos established in 1962